Carl Herman Doehling (April 17, 1896 – May 21, 1985) was an American football coach. He was the head football coach at the Ripon College in Ripon, Wisconsin from 1924 to 1955. During his 32-year reign, Doehling coached teams to 15 conference championships, nine in the Midwest Conference and six from the old Wisconsin state conference known as the Big Four Conference.

Career
Doehling began his coaching career in 1922 when he was offered a position at Central High School in Minneapolis, Minnesota. There he coached his teams to football and track state championships in successive years of 1923 and 1924. His success in the high school ranks, made him an attractive candidate to Ripon officials and in 1924 he was offered him the position as athletic director and head football coach. Ripon teams had struggled for years and Doehling was seen was given the charge of building the program from the ground up.

Doehling knew the entire program needed an overhaul. He looked at the University of Wisconsin–Madison athletic department as his model. Not only did Wisconsin have strong intercollegiate athletics teams, but they also had a huge intramural sports program. The coach saw this as something he felt should be in Ripon’s agenda and implemented it. By 1928, Ripon College had one of the strongest intramural departments in the state.

Ripon's intramural program and intercollegiate sports flourished during his time. Ripon gained clout on both the local, regional and national levels during his term. One of Doehling's grandest victories came when his 1928 squad, a heavy underdog, defeated the powerhouse University of Chicago, 12–0. This was Ripon’s first ever victory against a Big Ten Conference opponent, and reportedly spread the Redmen name across the country. Thirty-thousand spectators came out to witness Ripon’s great upset, probably the largest crowd a Ripon team has ever played.

Ripon teams did not always enjoy unbridled success during the Doehling era though. His final career record at Ripon was 95–99–24.

Memorial
In 1988, to commemorate the 25 years of rivalry between Doehling and Bernie Heselton, coach of Lawrence University from 1938 to 1964, the two schools instituted the Doehling–Heselton Memorial Trophy. The winner of the annual game between the Red Hawks and the Vikings is awarded this traveling trophy.

Head coaching record

Football

References

External links
 

1896 births
1985 deaths
Colorado State Rams football players
Ripon Red Hawks athletic directors
Ripon Red Hawks baseball coaches
Ripon Red Hawks football coaches
Ripon Red Hawks men's basketball coaches
College men's basketball head coaches in the United States
High school football coaches in Minnesota
High school track and field coaches in the United States
Sportspeople from Denver
People from Ripon, Wisconsin
Players of American football from Denver